Teamster Boss: The Jackie Presser Story is a 1992 American drama film directed by Alastair Reid and written by Abby Mann. It is based on the 1989 book Mobbed Up by James Neff. The film stars Brian Dennehy, Jeff Daniels, María Conchita Alonso, Eli Wallach, Robert Prosky and Donald Moffat. The film premiered on HBO on September 12, 1992.

Plot

Cast 

 Brian Dennehy as Jackie Presser
 Jeff Daniels as Tom Noonan
 María Conchita Alonso as Carmen De La Portilla-Presser
 Eli Wallach as Bill Presser
 Robert Prosky as Maishe
 Donald Moffat as O'Connell
 Al Waxman as Allen
 Tony Lo Bianco as Allen Dorfman
 Kate Reid as Faye
 Brad Sullivan as Dickerson
 Jude Ciccolella as Tony
 Victor Slezak as Sanger
 Val Avery as Salerno
 Frank Pellegrino as Anthony Provenzano
 Henderson Forsythe as Senator Bruckmeyer
 Tony Darrow as Nardi
 Norma Dell'Agnese as Linda
 Victor Ertmanis as Danny Greene
 Shannon Lawson as Cindy
 Conrad Bergschneider as Heavy
 Peter Bray as The Animal
 Richard Bright as The Bomber
 Peter Dvorsky as Mehren
 Gerald Gordon as Williams
 Howard Jerome as Minetta
 Elizabeth Lennie as Nancy
 Doug Lennox as Grogan
 James Millington as Maynard
 Bernie McInerney as Clines
 Jack Newman as Samuels
 Pat Patterson as Halluska
 Richard Poe as Bishop
 Steven Randazzo as Joey 'The Clown'
 Michael J. Reynolds as Brock 
 Michael Rhoades as Finnerty
 Maria Ricossa as Dorothy
 George R. Robertson as Howard Cannon
 Rhona Shekter as Gerry
 Larry Solway as Climaco
 Marc Strange as Garrity
 Catherine Swing as Secretary
 Al Therrien as Donovan
 Lenore Zann as Betty

References

External links
 

1992 television films
1992 films
American drama television films
1992 drama films
Films scored by Brad Fiedel
HBO Films films
1990s English-language films
Films directed by Alastair Reid
1990s American films